The 1948 Ohio Bobcats football team was an American football team that represented Ohio University in the Mid-American Conference (MAC) during the 1948 college football season. In their second and final season under head coach Harold Wise, the Bobcats compiled a 3–6 record (2–3 against MAC opponents), finished in fourth place in the MAC, and were outscored by all opponents by a combined total of 179 to 98. Three Ohio players received All-MAC honors: end John Marco (first team); halfback Jim McKenna (second team); and offensive guard Milt Taylor (second team).  They played their home games in Peden Stadium in Athens, Ohio.

Schedule

References

Ohio
Ohio Bobcats football seasons
Ohio Bobcats football